Shalin Mariya Lawrence (born 25 August 1983) is an author, columnist, Intersectional feminist, ambedkarite, and social activist. She has been active in dalitism, feminism, social activism and literature. She has been giving voice and fighting for various issues like violence against Dalits, injustice towards the natives of Chennai, manual scavenging deaths, social advancement of transgender people, forced displacements of indigenous people of chennai, everyday problems faced by women, and human rights abuses. She has written the books 'Vada chenaikkaari, 'Sandaikkaarigal : aangalai punpaduththum pakkanga', and 'Jensy ean kuraivaaga paadinaar'. She is a renowned activist and writer of Dalit literature in Tamil Nadu.

Early life 
Shalin Maria Lawrence was born in Patalam, Madras. She is based in Chennai.

Participation 

 She was a member of a panel discussion titled 'Penn and Politics' held by Shakti, an organization that rallies for equal political power for women with the Madras School of Social Work.
 She was one of the two resource persons in the three days national meet of dalit Christian women for change.

Special Mentions and Awards 
Shalin was mentioned as one of the '11 crusaders for gender justice in India' by GroundReport, a digital news platform.

Books 

 Vadachennaikkaari – 2018 – Uyirmmai Pathiagam
 Sandaikaarikal: Aankalai Punpaduthum Pakkangal – 2022
 Jensy ean kuraivaaga paadinaar – 2018

References

Additional References 

 https://behanbox.com/2022/07/31/why-india-is-struggling-with-an-increased-burden-of-teen-pregnancies/
 https://www.newindianexpress.com/cities/chennai/2021/aug/14/freedom-where-it-counts-2344359.html
 https://www.thehindu.com/news/cities/Madurai/hearing-shows-systemicflaws-in-getting-justice/article25702199.ece

External links 

 https://twitter.com/TheBluePen25
 https://www.facebook.com/Shalinmarialawrence/
 https://www.instagram.com/shalinmarialawrence

Living people
1983 births
Indian women activists
Tamil writers
Tamil-language writers
Writers from Chennai
Women writers from Tamil Nadu
20th-century Indian women writers
Indian writers
Indian writers by language
Indian writers by city
Dalit artists
Dalit activists
Activists
Indian activists
Indian activists by state or union territory
Indian women columnists